The 1903 Rhode Island Rams football team was an American football team that represented Rhode Island State College—now known as the University of Rhode Island—during the 1903 college football season. Led by fifth-year head coach Marshall Tyler, Rhode Island compiled a record of 2–4–1.

Schedule

References

Rhode Island
Rhode Island Rams football seasons
Rhode Island Rams football